Tlacolula District is located in the east of the Valles Centrales Region of the State of Oaxaca, Mexico.

Municipalities

The district includes the following municipalities:

Albarradas
Benito Juarez, Oaxaca
CD.Yagul
El Carrizal, Oaxaca
Fraccionamiento Danizu
Güendulain
Lachicocana
Macuilxóchitl
Magdalena Teitipac
Rojas de Cuauhtémoc
San Antonio Cuajimoloyas
San Bartolo Albarradas
San Bartolomé Quialana
San Dionisio Ocotepec
San Francisco Lachigoló
San Isidro Llano Grande
San Isidro Roaguía
San Jerónimo Tlacochahuaya
San José del Paso
San Juan del Río, Oaxaca
San Juan Guelavía
San Juan Teitipac
San Lorenzo Albarradas
San Lucas Quiaviní
San Marcos Tlapazola
San Miguel Albarradas
San Miguel del Valle, Oaxaca
San Pablo Guila
San Pablo Villa de Mitla
San Pedro Quiatoni
San Pedro Totolapa
San Sebastián Abasolo
San Sebastián Teitipac
Santa Ana del Rio
Santa Ana del Valle
Santa Catarina Albarradas
Santa Cruz Papalutla
Santa María Guelacé
Santa María Albarradas
Santa María Zoquitlán
Santa Martha Latuvi
Santiago Ixaltepec
Santiago Matatlán
Santo Domingo Albarradas
Tanivé
Teotitlán del Valle
Tlacolula de Matamoros
Union Zapata
Villa Díaz Ordaz
Xaagá

References

Districts of Oaxaca
Valles Centrales de Oaxaca